Angelos Liasos (born 26 May 2000) is a Greek professional footballer who plays as a defensive midfielder for Super League club PAS Giannina.

Career 
Liasos started from PAS Florina's youth setup. He transferred to PAS Giannina's youth setup. He signed a professional contract in January 2018. He made his professional debut against Panachaiki on 29 September 2019. Liasos scored his first goal against Volos FC on 17 April 2021 in a Greek Super League play out match.

Career statistics

Honours
PAS Giannina
Super League Greece 2: 2019–20

References

2000 births
Living people
Greek footballers
Greece under-21 international footballers
Super League Greece players
Super League Greece 2 players
PAS Giannina F.C. players
Association football midfielders
Footballers from Florina